Beshevlyarovo (Bişäwźär) is a rural locality (a village) in Arkaulovsky Selsoviet, Salavatsky District, Bashkortostan, Russia. The population was 220 as of 2010. There are 5 streets.

Geography 
Beshevlyarovo is located 31 km northwest of Maloyaz (the district's administrative centre) by road. Arkaulovo is the nearest rural locality.

References 

Rural localities in Salavatsky District